The Shire of Alberton was a local government area  about  southeast of Melbourne, the state capital of Victoria, Australia.

History

Alberton was first incorporated as a road district on 6 November 1855, one of the first ten in the colony, and became a shire on 2 February 1864. On 16 February 1894, part of the shire was excised, to become the Shire of South Gippsland. On 20 May 1914, it lost part of its North Riding to the Shire of Rosedale.

On 2 December 1994, the Shire of Alberton was abolished, and along with the City of Sale, the Shires of Avon and Maffra and parts of the Shire of Rosedale, was merged into the newly created Shire of Wellington.

Wards

The Shire of Alberton was divided into three ridings, each of which elected three councillors:
 South Riding
 Central Riding
 North Riding

Towns and localities

* Council seat.

Population

* Estimate in the 1958 Victorian Year Book.

References

External links
 Victorian Places - Alberton Shire

Alberton